The 82nd season of the Campeonato Catarinense began on January 17, 2007, and ended on May 6, 2007.

Format

First stage
Teams are divided into a groups of twelve teams.
One round-robin, in which all teams from one group play games against all teams within the group.

Second stage
Teams are divided into a groups of twelve teams.
One round-robin, in which all teams from one group play games against all teams within the group.

Third stage
Home-and-away playoffs with the top 2 teams of each stage.

The winner of the third stage is crowned the champion. The champions and the runner up qualify to Copa do Brasil 2008 and the champions qualify to Campeonato Brasileiro Série C 2007. The two teams with the worst positions are release to Divisão Especial 2007.

First stage

Second stage

† Próspera received a 12 points deduction penalty for fielding an ineligible player.

Third stage

* In Criciúma, because the Criciúma have better Punctuation in the two stages (Stage 1 points + Stage 2 points).

Final standings

† Próspera received a 12 points deduction penalty for fielding an ineligible player.

Results

Tablewise

 First Stage Games
Second Stage Games

Other Divisions

Divisão Especial: Four Teams
Champion: Joinville - Qualify to Divisão Principal 2008
Runner-up: Camboriuense - Release to Divisão de Acesso 2007
Third Place: Próspera - Release to Divisão de Acesso 2007
Fourth Place: Videira - Release to Divisão de Acesso 2007

Divisão de Acesso: 16 Teams

Champion: Atlético Tubarão - Qualify to Divisão Principal 2008
Runner-up:Catarinense (Ilhota)

Champion

Campeonato Catarinense seasons
Cat